The 2009 Connacht Senior Football Championship was that year's installment of the annual Connacht Senior Football Championship held under the auspices of the Connacht GAA. It was won by Mayo who defeated Galway in the final. The final was considered a weak affair by commentators. The winning Mayo team received the J. J. Nestor Cup, and automatically advanced to the quarter-final stage of the 2009 All-Ireland Senior Football Championship.

Bracket

Quarter-finals

Semi-finals

Final

References

External links
Connacht GAA website

2C
Connacht Senior Football Championship